M. Rex (short for Machina Rex) is a comic book title published by Image Comics' subsidiary Avalon. It began in 1999 and only ran for two issues, but inspired the animated series Generator Rex.

Background
Avalon Studios was formed in 1999 by Filipino comic book writer Whilce Portacio and American colorist Brian Haberlin. M. Rex was one of the studio's  first titles. It was by Aaron Sowd, Joe Kelly and Duncan Rouleau. It ran for two issues, The Actress, the Agent and the Apprentice and Size Matters.

Characters
Three of the central characters were adapted into Generator Rex:
Agent Six (he wields paired swords)
Knight (called "White Knight") (he wields paired pistols)
Rex (called Rex Salazar) (his pair of arms can turn into many different types of weapons)
Three others were not:
Mia Moore
Simon Babbage
Spilken

References

1999 comics debuts
1999 comics endings
Comics adapted into animated series
Comics adapted into television series
Avalon Studios
Defunct American comics
Generator Rex
Image Comics titles